is a former Nippon Professional Baseball outfielder.

External links

1962 births
Living people
Baseball people from Hiroshima Prefecture
Japanese baseball players
Nippon Professional Baseball outfielders
Hankyu Braves players
Orix Braves players
Orix BlueWave players
Japanese baseball coaches
Nippon Professional Baseball coaches